The Presbyterian Church in Korea (HapDongHwanWon) is a result of the unification of 3 groups in 1983. HwanWon church united with the independent JungAng Presbytery and the JeongTong church. It subscribes the Apostles Creed and the Westminster Confession. In 2004 it had almost 10,000 members in 46 congregations served by 46 pastors.

References 

Presbyterian denominations in South Korea
Presbyterian denominations in Asia
Christian organizations established in 1983